Carl Edouarde (31 October 1875 – 8 December 1932) was an American composer of film music, known particularly for his association with Samuel Roxy Rothafel.

Background
Edouarde was born in Cleveland, Ohio to an Irish-American family on 31 October 1875.  Studying violin at an early age, he finished his education in Europe.  He graduated from the Royal Conservatory of Leipzig in 1899 and returned to the United States that year with Allessandro Liberati's band as a virtuoso violinist.  Shortly thereafter, Edouarde taught at the Cleveland Conservatory of Music as professor of harmony and theory.  He left the Conservatory several years later to become the leader of Knapp's Millionaire Band, and soon thereafter reorganized the group as the Carl Edouarde Concert Band in New York City.  Rothafel originally hired the services of Edouarde at the Regent Theatre in New York in 1912.  When Rothafel opened the Strand Theatre in 1914, he appointed Edouarde as the lead conductor, a position he would hold for thirteen years.

Edouarde compiled photoplay music into scores for features at the Strand regularly, including The Hunchback of Notre Dame (1923 film) and The Private Life of Helen of Troy (1927). In 1927, Edouarde left the Strand in order to work in the field of synchronizing musical scores to sound film.  During this time, he synchronized several films for Pathe, including A Close Call, Barnyard Melody and Tuning In.  On December 10, 1929, during the production of a musical short, the Pathe Studio in New York caught fire, killing several people.  Edouarde survived from leaping from a second-story window, but broke his ankle enough that it effectively ended his career as a conductor.

Following an operation, Edouarde died in his home in Locust, New Jersey on December 8, 1932, at the age of 57.

1875 births
1932 deaths
American film score composers
American male film score composers
Musicians from Cleveland